The Grant Boyhood Home is a historic house museum at 219 East Grant Avenue in Georgetown, Ohio.  Built in 1823, it was where United States President and American Civil War General Ulysses S. Grant (1822–85) lived from 1823 until 1839, when he left for the United States Military Academy at West Point.  In 1976, the house was listed on the National Register of Historic Places.  Nine years later, it was designated a National Historic Landmark.  It is now owned by a local nonprofit organization as part of a suite of Grant-related museum properties in Georgetown.

Description and history
The Grant Boyhood Home is located northeast of the center of Georgetown, at the northwest corner of East Grant Avenue and North Water Street.  It is a -story brick house, with a side-gable roof and a three-bay front facade. The main entrance is in the leftmost bay, and all of the window and door openings are topped by stone lintels.  A two-story brick ell extends to the rear, as do a pair of single-story wood frame ells; all of these are either 19th-century additions made by Jesse Grant, or are reconstructions.  The interior of the house retains original flooring and woodwork.

The house, along with a number of its additions, was built in 1823 by Jesse and Hannah Grant, the parents of Ulysses S. Grant.  The family moved into this house when Ulysses was 16 months old, and it is where he grew up.  Grant left for West Point in 1839, but was a frequent visitor over the next few years, and this house is the home he lived in the longest.  Grant is known to have spent substantial time at his father's tannery, located just across the street.

By the 1970s, the house had deteriorated in condition and was at threat of demolition.  It was rescued from that fate, and the nonprofit US Grant Homestead Association was formed to restore and maintain it.  The organization now owns the house, a schoolhouse attended by Grant, and the tannery building.

See also
Grant Birthplace, Point Pleasant, Ohio
Ulysses S. Grant National Historic Site, near St. Louis
Ulysses S. Grant Home, Galena, Illinois
Grant Cottage State Historic Site, Mt. McGregor, New York
General Grant National Memorial (Grant's Tomb)

References

External links

 U.S. Grant Boyhood Home and Schoolhouse - Ohio History Connection
 US Grant Homestead Association

Houses completed in 1823
Historic house museums in Ohio
Houses on the National Register of Historic Places in Ohio
Museums in Brown County, Ohio
National Register of Historic Places in Brown County, Ohio
Ulysses S. Grant
National Historic Landmarks in Ohio
Presidential museums in Ohio
Presidential homes in the United States
Ohio History Connection
Houses in Brown County, Ohio